Pripek may refer to:

 Pripek, Burgas Province
 Pripek, Kardzhali Province
 Pripek, Varna Province
 Pripek Point, entrance to Dimitrov Cove in Graham Land, Antarctica.